Jiangxin Temple is a Buddhist temple located on Jiangxin Island, in Lucheng District of Wenzhou, Zhejiang, China.

History

Tang dynasty
The temple was first built with the name of "Puji Chan Temple" in 866, in the reign of Emperor Yizong (860–874) of the Tang dynasty (618–907). It was renamed "Longxiang Chan Temple" in 1131, in the Shaoxing period (1127–1162) of Southern Song dynasty (1127–1279). Because the temple situated in the middle of the Ou River, it more commonly known as the "Jiangxin Temple" ("Jiang" means river and "Xin" means middle).

Song dynasty
In 969, under the rule of Emperor Taizu (960–976) of the Northern Song dynasty (960–1127), the Jingxin Jiangyuan was erected in its east.

People's Republic of China
After the founding of PRC, local government renovated and refurbished the temple.

Jiangxin Temple has been inscribed as a National Key Buddhist Temple in Han Chinese Area by the State Council of China in 1983. The Buddhist temple status was resumed in 1985 and religious activities were revived.  

The temple has been designated as a provincial level cultural heritage by the Zhejiang Provincial Government in 2011.

Architecture

Now the existing main buildings include Shanmen, Heavenly Kings Hall, Mahavira Hall, Yuantong Hall, Hall of Three Saints, East Pagoda, and West Pagoda.

Yuantong Hall
In the center of the Yuantong Hall enshrines the statue of Guanyin with Shancai standing on the left and Longnü on the right. Statue of Maitreya is enshrined at the back of Guanyin's statue. Under the eaves is a plaque with the Chinese characters "Yuantong Hall" written by Qianlong Emperor (1736–1795) in the Qing dynasty (1644–1911).

Hall of Three Saints
The Hall of Three Saints enshrining the statues of Three Sages of the West, namely Guanyin, Amitabha and Mahasthamaprapta.

East Pagoda

The East Pagoda was originally built in 869 or 969 and rebuilt in the following dynasties many times. The pagoda originally had rafters and corridors, in 1894, the British government established the British Consulate in Wenzhou near the pagoda, and forced local government to demolish the rafters and corridors.

West Pagoda

The West Pagoda was first built in 869 or 969 and underwent three largely renovations, respectively in the ruling of Hongwu Emperor (1368–1398) in the Ming dynasty (1368–1644), in the reign of Wanli Emperor (1573–1620) and in the Qianlong period (1736–1796) of the Qing dynasty (1644–1911). A total of 16 statues of Buddha are carved in the body of the pagoda.

Culture
The East Pagoda has appeared in the Japanese manga One Piece.

References

Bibliography

External links
   

Buddhist temples in Wenzhou
Buildings and structures in Wenzhou
Tourist attractions in Wenzhou
20th-century establishments in China
20th-century Buddhist temples
Religious buildings and structures completed in 1952